William Nicolle is a former association football player who represented New Zealand at international level.

Nicolle made a single appearance in an official international for the All Whites in a 1–0 win over Canada on 9 July 1927.

References

Year of birth missing
Possibly living people
New Zealand association footballers
New Zealand international footballers

Association footballers not categorized by position